The 2013 Strade Bianche was the 7th edition of the international one-day cycling race Strade Bianche. The race was held on 2 March 2013, on the same route of the previous edition. The race started in Gaiole del Chianti and ended in Piazza del Campo in Siena.

The race was won by 's rider Moreno Moser, the nephew of Francesco Moser. Moser attacked together with Juan Antonio Flecha with 17 km to go, chased down the four fugitives Michael Schär, Maxim Belkov, Giairo Ermeti and Aleksejs Saramotins, and attacked again for a solo breakaway on the final climb in the last kilometer.

Teams
The start list includes 17 teams – 11 ProTeams and 6 Professional Continental Teams – and a total of 136 riders.

Results

References

Strade Bianche
Strade Bianche
Strade Bianche